{{DISPLAYTITLE:C9H13N5O3}}
The molecular formula C9H13N5O3 (molar mass: 239.235 g/mol) may refer to:

 Dihydrobiopterin (BH2)
 S2242

Molecular formulas